Újszentiván is a village in Csongrád county, in the Southern Great Plain region of southern Hungary. Residents are Magyars, with minority of Serbs.

Geography

Populated places in Csongrád-Csanád County
Serb communities in Hungary